Søren Hess-Olesen (born 9 January 1991) is a Danish tennis player.

Hess-Olesen has a career high ATP singles ranking of 937 achieved on 18 December 2017.

Hess-Olesen represents Denmark at the Davis Cup, where he has a W/L record of 3–3.

Career finals

Singles

See also
List of Denmark Davis Cup team representatives

References 
 
 
 

1991 births
Danish male tennis players
Living people
Sportspeople from Aarhus
Texas Longhorns men's tennis players
21st-century Danish people